Raghunath Dhondo Karve (14 January 1882 – 14 October 1953) was a professor of mathematics and a social reformer from Maharashtra, India. He was a pioneer in initiating family planning and birth control for masses in Mumbai in 1921.

Born in a Chitpavan Brahmin family, Raghunath was the eldest son of Bharat Ratna Maharshi Dhondo Keshav Karve. His mother Radhabai died during childbirth in 1891, when he was nine. He was born in Murud. He studied at New English School, Pune. He stood first in a matriculation examination conducted in 1899. He went to Fergusson College, Pune where he obtained a Bachelor of Arts degree in 1904.  Karve started his professional career as a professor of mathematics at Wilson College in Mumbai. However, when he started publicly expressing his views about family planning, population control, and women's right to experience sexual/sensual pleasure as much as men, the conservative Christian administrators of the college asked him to resign from the professorship. He then devoted himself to the above causes.

On his own initiative, Karve started the very first birth control clinic in India in 1921, the same year when the first birth control clinic opened in London.

Books authored
 ‘Santatiniyaman Aachar ani Vichar’ (Family planning: Thoughts and Action) in 1923
 ‘Guptrogapasun Bachav’ & ‘Aadhunik Kaamashastra’ 
 In 1927 he published ‘Samajswasthya’; a monthly on social health, and continued it till death (14 October 1953). Through this monthly, he tried to educated people about sex education. He hardly could meet his own needs, yet he never ceased from continuing the monthly
 ‘Adhunik Kamashastra’ (1934)
 ‘Adhunik Aharshastra’ (1938) 
 ‘Vaishya Vyavasay’ (1940), which had a scientific approach. 
 Some of his other light themed books were ‘Parischya Ghari’ (1946) and ’13 Goshti’ (1940)

Samaj Swasthya
Karve published a Marathi magazine Samaj Swasthya (समाजस्वास्थ्य) starting from July 1927 until 1953. In it, he continually discussed issues of society's well-being through population control through use of contraceptives so as prevent unwanted pregnancies and induced abortions. He promoted responsible parenting by men, gender equality, and women's empowerment and right to experience sexual/sensual pleasure. As an illustration of some of Karve's radical thoughts, he expressed the thought that so long as childbirth and venereal diseases are prevented, women could engage in promiscuity—even perhaps with male prostitutes—for the sake of variety in sexual pleasure, if they so desire, without, in fact, harming their husbands. All the issues of this magazine are now available at www.radhonkarve.com

Wife's support
Karve's wife, Malati, supported his cause though it brought them social ostracism besides his loss of his professorial career. She shared the couple's financial responsibility, and the two chose to remain childless.

Apart from his wife, he had support of Dr. Ambedkar, "Wrangler Paranjape", Riyastkar Sardesai, and Mama Varekar. He had to swim against the current all his life. He got hurt, but he never gave up.

Critic's analysis
Literary critic M V Dhond has written three essays on Karve. In the third essay, he analyses why Karve was not as successful in his mission as much as Margaret Sanger and Marie Stopes, his counterparts in United States and UK, respectively.

Karve's mission was not restricted to that of Sanger and Stopes namely happy family life, emancipation of women, control of population. Karve wanted women to have as much sexual freedom and sensual pleasure as men.

Dhond claims contemporary society's objectives were restricted to those of Sanger and Stopes and hence not only Karve's mission as a whole suffered, he himself was persecuted by society at large. There were other reasons too: Karve's unattractive personality, poor finances, and lack of networking skills.

It's unfortunate Karve was not alive when three major events, that make us understand woman sexuality better, took place- 
1. Publication of the Kinsey report in 1953 
2. Publication of Masters and Johnson's book in 1966 and 
3. Publication of The Hite Report in 1976. 
These documents have proven how right Karve was with his thoughts on woman's sexuality.

Further reading
"Ra. Dho. Karve" (र. धो. कर्वे) by Yashawant Dinkar Phadke, 1981 (in Marathi)
"'Samajswastya'kar"- a biography of R.D.Karve by Dr. Anant Deshmukh, Padmagandha Prakashan, 2010
"Maharashtrache Shilpakaar – Ra Dho Karve" -a biography by Dr Anant Deshmukh, (2013)
"Ra. Dho. Karve" (र. धो. कर्वे) : Vyaktitva aani kartrutva by Dr. Anant Deshmukh (2010)
"'Samajswastya'til nivadak lekh" edited by Dr. Anant Deshmukh, Padmagandha Prakashan, 2010
"Mopansa'chya katha" edited by Dr. Anant Deshmukh, Padmagandha Prakashan, 2010
"Buddhipramanyawad (translated by Prof. Madhukar Toradmal)" edited by Dr. Anant Deshmukh, Padmagandha Prakshan, 2010
"Asangrahita R.D.Karve" edited by Dr. Anant Deshmukh, Padmagandha Prakashan, 2010
"R.D.Karve-Mate aani Matantare" edited by Dr. Anant Deshmukh, Padmagandha Prakashan, 2010
"Shesha Samajswastya" edited by Dr. Anant Deshmukh, Padmagandha Prakashan, 2010
"Nivadak 'Sharadechi Patre'" edited by Dr. Anant Deshmukh, Padmagandha Prakashan, 2010
Research articles on R. D. Karve by Dr. Anant Deshmukh
Raghunathrao Dhondo Karve – Ek drashta purush – Article in Loksatta by Dr Anant Deshmukh 12-Jan-2003
Avaghe Ra Dho (अवघे ‘रधों’) – Article in Loksatta 10-Oct-2010
"Majhe Puran" by Anandibai Karve, 1951 (Marathi)
"Kahi Ambat Kahi God" by Shakuntala Paranjape, 1979 (Marathi)
"Upekshit Drashta" by Diwakar Bapat, 1971 (Marathi)
Marathi novel based on R D Karve's life: "Raghunathachi Bakhar" (रघुनाथाची बखर) by S J Joshi (श्री ज जोशी), 1976
National family health survey (NFHS-2), India, 1998–99
The Journal of Family Welfare By Family Planning Association of India
National family health survey (MCH and family planning)
[https://www.imdb.com/title/tt0331232/ Marathi film on the life of R. D. Karve: Dhyasparva (2001)], directed by Amol Palekar

References

External links
 Article by Dr. Anant Deshmukh (डॉ. अनंत देशमुख) (Marathi)

Sex educators
Indian birth control activists
Marathi people
1882 births
1953 deaths
19th-century Indian mathematicians
20th-century Indian mathematicians
Activists from Maharashtra
Scientists from Mumbai